Liu Xianying (born July 8, 1977, in Jilin) is a former Chinese biathlete who competed in the 1998 Winter Olympics, the 2002 Winter Olympics, the 2006 Winter Olympics and the 2010 Winter Olympics.

She retired after the 2009–10 season.

References

External links
 

Chinese female biathletes
Biathletes at the 1998 Winter Olympics
Biathletes at the 2002 Winter Olympics
Biathletes at the 2006 Winter Olympics
Biathletes at the 2010 Winter Olympics
People from Tonghua
1977 births
Olympic biathletes of China
Living people
Biathlon World Championships medalists
Sport shooters from Jilin
Asian Games medalists in biathlon
Biathletes at the 1999 Asian Winter Games
Biathletes at the 2003 Asian Winter Games
Biathletes at the 2007 Asian Winter Games
Asian Games gold medalists for China
Asian Games silver medalists for China
Asian Games bronze medalists for China
Medalists at the 1999 Asian Winter Games
Medalists at the 2003 Asian Winter Games
Medalists at the 2007 Asian Winter Games
Skiers from Jilin
21st-century Chinese women